Waverley is a suburb of the city of Pretoria, South Africa. Located just northeast of the CBD in a leafy, established area that is home to some well-constructed residences on large stands. Its neighbouring suburbs are Rietfontein and Villieria.

References

Suburbs of Pretoria